Aissam Rami (born 8 May 1975) is a Moroccan fencer. He competed in the individual épée events at the 2004 and 2008 Summer Olympics.

References

External links
 

1975 births
Living people
Moroccan male épée fencers
Olympic fencers of Morocco
Fencers at the 2004 Summer Olympics
Fencers at the 2008 Summer Olympics
21st-century Moroccan people